The Liebig Medal (German: Liebig-Denkmünze) was established by the  (Verein Deutscher Chemiker) in 1903 to celebrate the centenary of Justus von Liebig. Since 1946 it has been awarded by the Society of German Chemists (Gesellschaft Deutscher Chemiker, GDCh).

Recipients 
Source: Gesellschaft Deutscher Chemiker (GDCh)

 1903 Adolf von Baeyer, Munich
 1904 Rudolf Knietsch, Ludwigshafen 
 1905 Eduard Buchner, Würzburg
 1907 Adolph Frank, Berlin
 1908 Otto Schönherr, Dresden
 1909 Otto Schott, Jena
 1911 Paul Ehrlich, Frankfurt am Main
 1912 Carl Dietrich Harries, Berlin
 1913 Emil Ehrensberger, Traunstein 
 1914 Fritz Haber, Berlin
 1919 Carl Bosch, Ludwigshafen
 1921 Max Planck, Berlin
 1922 Wilhelm Normann, Chemnitz
 1924 Max Schroeder, Berlin
 1925 Gustav Heinrich Johann Apollon Tammann, Göttingen
 1926 Robert-Emanuel Schmidt, Wuppertal-Elberfeld
 1927 Fritz Raschig, Ludwigshafen
 1928 Friedrich Bergius, Heidelberg
 1929 Hans Fischer, München
 1930 Otto Ruff, Breslau
 1931 Friedrich Emich, Graz; Ida Noddack and Walter Noddack, Berlin 
 1933 Adolf Spilker, Duisburg
 1934 Ferdinand Flury, Würzburg
 1935 Walther A. Roth, Braunschweig and Karl Ziegler, Heidelberg
 1936 Gustav F. Hüttig, Prag
 1937 Ernst Späth, Vienna
 1938 Eduard Zintl, Darmstadt
 1940 Otto Hönigschmid, Munich
 1950 Erich Konrad, Leverkusen
 1951 Wilhelm Klemm, Münster
 1953 Wilhelm Moschel, Leverkusen
 1955 Feodor Lynen, München
 1956 Heinrich Hock, Clausthal
 1957 Friedrich Adolf Paneth, Mainz
 1958 Gerhard Schramm, Tübingen
 1960 Georg-Maria Schwab, Munich
 1961 Rolf Huisgen, Munich
 1964 Günter Scheibe, Munich
 1965 Wilhelm Husmann, Aachen
 1967 Erich Thilo, Berlin
 1969 Oskar Glemser, Göttingen
 1972 Hans-Werner Kuhn, Göttingen
 1973 Leopold Horner, Mainz
 1976 Horst Pommer, Ludwigshafen
 1980 Ernst Ruch, Berlin
 1981 Armin Weiss, Munich
 1983 Dieter Oesterhelt, Munich
 1984 Ulrich Schöllkopf, Göttingen
 1986 Rolf Appel, Bonn
 1987 Gerhard Ertl, Berlin
 1989 Meinhart Zenk, Munich
 1991 Kurt Issleib, Halle/Saale
 1993 Reinhard W. Hoffmann, Marburg
 1994 Wolfgang Beck, Munich
 1996 Werner Kutzelnigg, Bochum
 1998 Helmut Schwarz, Berlin
 2000 Reinhart Ahlrichs, Karlsruhe
 2002 Hans Wolfgang Spiess, Mainz
 2004 Arndt Simon, Stuttgart
 2006 , Munich
 2008 Wolfgang Krätschmer, Heidelberg
 2010 Joachim Sauer, Berlin
 2012 Walter Thiel, Mülheim a.d. Ruhr
 2014 Hans-Ulrich Reissig, Berlin
 2016 Markus Antonietti, Potsdam
 2018 Wolfgang Schnick, München
 2020 Herbert Waldmann, Dortmund
 2022 Claudia Felser, Dresden

See also

 List of chemistry awards

References

External links 
  

Awards of the Society of German Chemists
Justus von Liebig